Galena Township may refer to one of the following places in the United States:

 Galena Township, LaPorte County, Indiana
 Galena Township, Martin County, Minnesota
 Galena Township, Jasper County, Missouri
 Galena Township, Dixon County, Nebraska

See also

 East Galena Township, Jo Daviess County, Illinois
 West Galena Township, Jo Daviess County, Illinois

Township name disambiguation pages